Jurupa Valley (Serrano: Hurumpa) is a city in the northwest corner of Riverside County, California, United States. It was the location of one of the earliest non-native settlements in the county, Rancho Jurupa. The Rancho was initially an outpost of the Mission San Gabriel Arcángel, then a Mexican land grant in 1838. The name is derived from a Native American village that existed in the area prior to the arrival of Europeans.

On March 8, 2011, voters approved a ballot measure, Measure A, to incorporate and form the city of Jurupa Valley.  The effective date of incorporation was July 1, 2011. Residents of the area had previously voted on incorporation in 1992, but rejected that measure, along with a competing ballot measure that would have incorporated Mira Loma.

It is bordered by the cities of Eastvale, Norco, and Riverside in Riverside County and the cities of Ontario, Fontana, Rialto, and Colton in neighboring San Bernardino County.

History

Etymology

Although there was no geographic feature or town officially named Jurupa Valley prior to the establishment of the city in 2011, the term Jurupa Valley is known to have been used as early as 1887 when referring to lands along the northeast side of the Santa Ana River opposite the city of Riverside.   The name Jurupa was derived from the 1838 Mexican land grant Rancho Jurupa, which the Jurupa Valley area had been part of. The Rancho in turn derived its name from a previous Jurupa rancho operated by the Mission San Gabriel Arcángel, until the mission was disbanded through the Mexican secularization act of 1833. The first rancho was named for the Native American village Jurupa that existed in the area prior to the arrival of European colonizers.  Both Serrano and Gabrieleño Indians lived in the area. The Gabrieleño referred to the village as Jurungna or Hurungna.

The exact meaning of the word Jurupa is disputed. The 1890 book, An Illustrated History of Southern California, states that the word Jurupa was a greeting, meaning ″peace and friendship″, used by the Native Americans when the first Catholic priest visited the area. In 1902 Father Juan Caballeria, in his History of San Bernardino Valley; From the Padres to the Pioneer, states that the word was derived from Jurumpa, meaning watering place. Later linguistic studies concluded that the name likely refers to Juru, the Artemisia californica (California sagebrush), common in the area.

Incorporation 
On June 2, 1992, under measures E, F, and G, the first effort to form a city was voted down by the electorate. Measure E, whether or not to incorporate Jurupa and Mira Loma, lost 76% to 24%. Measure F, whether to vote city council members by district or at large, if incorporation passed, was 69% district, and 31% at large. Measure G, the selection of a city name, had the following results; Jurupa 40%, Rancho Jurupa 23%, West Riverside 21%, and Camino Real 16%. At the time Jurupa was described as including the neighborhoods of Rubidoux, Pedley and Glen Avon.

On March 8, 2011, a second proposal for incorporation was put before the voters. This time the measure passed with 54% voting yes, 46% voting no, and with an effective date of July 1, 2011. At the time the new city was estimated to have a population of 88,000, and included the communities of Mira Loma, Glen Avon, Sky Country, Indian Hills, Pedley, Rubidoux, Belltown, Jurupa, Jurupa Hills, and Sunnyslope.

The city immediately faced the possibility of disincorporation when the State of California passed Senate Bill 89, which shifted millions of dollars of vehicle license fees away from cities. The new city struggled for several years, and in 2014 notified the Riverside County Local Agency Formation Commission that it might be necessary to disincorporate. In September 2015, Senate Bill 25 was passed by the California Assembly and Senate to restore funding to cities, but was vetoed by then Governor Jerry Brown. Later in the month Senate Bill 107 was signed by the governor. It remediated many of the outstanding debts of Jurupa Valley, as well as three other recently incorporated cities in Riverside County.

Historic events 
 Between 1926 and 1928 the Wineville Chicken Coop Murders, a series of abductions and murders of young boys, took place within Jurupa Valley city limits. At the time the community of Wineville was unincorporated. Today it is the Jurupa Valley neighborhood of Mira Loma. 
 The Stringfellow Acid Pits, a toxic waste dump, and a Superfund site, became the center of national news coverage in the early 1980s.

Demographics 

According to the United States Census Bureau, as of 2020, the population was 105,053 with 71.4% of the population of Jurupa Valley being Hispanic or Latino, 20.6% of the population being White non-Hispanic, 3.2% of the population being Black or African American, 3.6% of the population being Asian, and 3.6% of the population is of two races or more.

Government
Federal:
In the House of Representatives, the vast majority of Jurupa Valley is part of the 39th Congressional District, represented by Democrat Mark Takano.

California is represented in the United States Senate by Democrats Dianne Feinstein and Alex Padilla.

State:
In the California State Legislature, Jurupa Valley is located in the 31st Senate District, represented by Democrat Richard Roth, and in the 60th Assembly District, represented by Democrat Sabrina Cervantes.

Local:
Jurupa Valley is the Second District in Riverside County and is represented by Board of Supervisor Karen Spiegel.
The area parks are served and maintained by the Jurupa Area Recreation and Parks District.
Utilities:

 Water and Sanitation is provided by the Jurupa Community Services District and Rubidoux Community Services District.

Education
Jurupa Valley is home to the Jurupa Unified School District.  The district operates 16 elementary schools, four middle schools, three continuation schools, and four high schools, including:
Jurupa Valley High School
Rubidoux High School
Patriot High School
Rivercrest Preparatory

Transportation
Public transportation in Jurupa Valley is provided by Riverside Transit Agency. Also, Jurupa Valley/Pedley station (formerly Pedley Station) is served by Metrolink. Jurupa Valley is home to Flabob Airport, a small public-use airport. However, commercial flights are served by the nearby Ontario International Airport.

The major freeways in Jurupa Valley are Interstate 15, which serves as the city's western border, and California State Route 60, which runs along the northern side of the city.

Culture, sports & recreation
Notable sites include:
Galleano Winery
Jensen Alvarado Ranch
Jurupa Mountains Discovery Center
Rancho Jurupa Regional Park
The Cove Waterpark
Golf facilities:
Goose Creek Golf Club
Indian Hills Country Club
Jurupa Hills Country Club
Oak Quarry Golf Club

Geography
Jurupa Valley is located north and west of the Santa Ana River across from Riverside, California, south of the Riverside–San Bernardino county line, and east of Interstate 15. It includes the nine distinct neighborhoods, or communities, of Belltown, Crestmore Heights, Glen Avon, Indian Hills, Jurupa Hills, Pedley, Rubidoux, Sunnyslope, and Mira Loma.

Climate

References

Bibliography

Citations

External links

 

 
Cities in Riverside County, California
Incorporated cities and towns in California
Populated places established in 2011
2011 establishments in California